Lecithocera atricastana is a moth in the family Lecithoceridae first described by Kyu-Tek Park in 1999. It is found in Taiwan.

The wingspan is 15.5–17 mm. The forewings are narrow and dark brown throughout. There is a broad, creamy-white transverse fascia in the middle. The hindwings are grey.

Etymology
The species name is derived from the Latin ater (meaning black) and castanea (meaning brown) and refers to the dark-brown forewing.

References

Moths described in 1999
atricastana